Chick Magnet may refer to:

Chick Magnet (album), by Paul Wall, or the title song, 2004
"Chick Magnet", a song by MxPx from Life in General, 1996
"Chick Magnet" (Aqua Teen Hunger Force), a 2009 TV episode

See also
Chick Magnet Punk, now CM Punk, a professional wrestler